is a Japanese footballer who plays as a midfielder for Thai League 3 club Chiangrai City.

Club statistics
.

Reserves performance
Last Updated: 26 December 2019.

References

External links

Profile at Kamatamare Sanuki

1996 births
Living people
Association football people from Osaka Prefecture
People from Yao, Osaka
Japanese footballers
J1 League players
J2 League players
J3 League players
Cerezo Osaka players
Cerezo Osaka U-23 players
Kamatamare Sanuki players
Thai League 3 players
Association football midfielders